Chubut may refer to:

 Chubut Province, Argentina
 Chubut River in the Chubut Province
 Chubut steamer duck, a flightless duck endemic to Argentina